Kevin Lynch (born February 2, 1984) is a male beach volleyball player from the United States who participated at the NORCECA Circuit 2009 at Cayman Islands playing with Sean Allstot. They finished in the 7th position.

References

External links
 
 Kevin Lynch at AVP
 

Living people
1984 births
American men's beach volleyball players